Kuldīga Half Marathon is an annual road marathon, held in Kuldīga, Latvia. The main sponsor of the marathon is SEB. It is also the Latvian championship in half marathon.

It is known as a tough half marathon - usually the weather in the old city's streets is rather hot, the track has many curves and most of the streets in the city are cobblestoned.

Winners
Key:

External links
 Kuldiga Half Marathon

Kuldīga
Half marathons
Athletics competitions in Latvia
Summer events in Latvia